The German Hotel is a 1790 comedy play by the British writer Thomas Holcroft.

The original Covent Garden cast included John Quick as Count Werling, Joseph George Holman as Dorville, Francis Aickin as Count Kolberg, William Farren as Baron Thorck, Richard Wilson as Rummer, John Bernard as William, Charles Farley as Messenger, Isabella Mattocks as Adelaide and Jane Pope as Mrs Dorville.

George III and Queen Charlotte attended a performance of the play in December 1790 "and seemed highly gratified with the whole performance".

References

Bibliography
 Nicoll, Allardyce. A History of English Drama 1660–1900: Volume III. Cambridge University Press, 2009.
 Hogan, C.B (ed.) The London Stage, 1660–1800: Volume V. Southern Illinois University Press, 1968.

1790 plays
Comedy plays
West End plays
Plays by Thomas Holcroft